The GAZ-AA was a truck produced at the Gorki Auto Plant from 1932 to 1938, as the company's first truck produced under the GAZ brand name.

History 
In 1929 the Soviet Union made an agreement with the Ford Motor Company to produce the Ford Model A and Model AA vehicles at an automotive plant built in Nijni Novgorod. 

Initially, 10 Ford Model AA trucks were built at the plant, under the NAZ name (Nijni Novgorod Automobilni Zavod). Soviet engineers prepared their own mechanical blueprints for production, for the truck to be made by more thick steel and to have an upgraded suspension system. During the following years, the plant was renamed to Gorki Automobilni Zavod after Maxim Gorki, leading the index of the trucks to be changed to GAZ-AA. By 1932, the GAZ-AA started to get mass-produced and by that time around 60 trucks were built at the plant daily from knock-down kits sent by Ford.

Soon the assembly of the GAZ-A passenger vehicles started, that were based on the Ford Model A and were also built from knock-down kits that were imported to the Soviet Union. By that time GAZ-AA trucks made the majority of trucks used by the Red Army. Several modifications of the GAZ-AA trucks started getting produced, including dump trucks (410), semi-trucks (MS), fire trucks (PMG-1) and tractors (905).

By 1938, nearly 1 million of these trucks had been produced and sold. By that time a modernized variant of the GAZ-AA trucks, under the GAZ-MM index started getting produced, with the engine from the GAZ-M1, that boosted the vehicle's power to 50 hp, with the compression ratio increased to 4.6, with the vehicle's maximum speed being 80 km / h.

Variants 
 GAZ-AAA:
 GAZ-410: dump truck
 BA-27M: military vehicle using GAZ-AA assemblies
 GAZ-42: version with a gas generator
 GAZ-60: half-track version made for the Red Army
 PMG-1: fire truck
 GAZ-905: tractor version
 GAZ-03-30: bus variant
 GAZ-55: ambulance variant
 GAZ-MS: log truck

References

Further reading 
 Andy Thompson: Trucks of the Soviet Union: The Definitive History. Behemont 2017, .

External link

GAZ Group trucks
1930s cars